[[Image:Portrait of Cesar Chavez by Manuel Gregorio Acosta, 1969.jpg|thumb|Illustration of labor leader César Chávez by Acosta, was on the cover of Time, published July 4, 1969|alt=Illustration of labor leader César Chávez by Acosta, was on the cover of Time', published July 4, 1969]]
Manuel Gregorio Acosta (1921–1989) was a Mexican-born American painter, muralist, sculptor, and illustrator. His work received more recognition during the Chicano movement, and his portrait of Cesar Chavez was reproduced on the cover of Time magazine in 1969.

 Early life and education 
Manuel Gregorio Acosta was born on May 9, 1921 into a family in Aldama, Chihuahua, Mexico. His father, Ramón P. Acosta, had fought in the Mexican Revolution with Pancho Villa, and the Mexican Revolution was a recurring theme in Manuel's paintings. The family moved to El Paso, Texas when Manuel was a child. Acosta attended Bowie High School, where he started studying art. He always seemed interested in drawings, so as practice he would mock pictures of newspapers and later started drawing pin up girls. Manuel Acosta served in the United States Air Force during World War II, during which time he continued practicing his artwork, and became an American citizen shortly after discharge.

In the fall of 1946 he attended the College of Mines and Metallurgy (now the University of Texas at El Paso), where he studied drawing and sculpture under sculptor Urbici Soler. He started to sketch people and views from El Paso's barrios in a realistic style. In 1952 he became an apprentice to painter Peter Hurd on a mural project about pioneer Texas located at the West Texas Museum in Lubbock. He spent a year at the Chouinard Art Institute in Los Angeles and six months at the University of California, Santa Barbara, before establishing his home and studio in El Paso, Texas.

 Career 
During the height of the worker's rights movement, Acosta's portrait of Cesar Chavez was reproduced on the cover of Time magazine on July 4, 1969. The original portrait is now part of the National Portrait Gallery's permanent collection.

Acosta moved his studio home in order to make his way for a new highway, so he built a new adobe building at 366 Buena Vista.

 Death and legacy 
He was bludgeoned with a lead pipe and murdered on October 25, 1989, at the age of 68, by a drunken Mexican national and is buried in the United States at Fort Bliss National Cemetery.

A 1995 mural in El Paso was created as a tribute, "Memorial to Manuel Acosta"  by artists Carlos Rossas and Felipe Gallegos.

In 2018, Acosta's work was included in the El Paso Museum of Art group exhibition, Early West Texas: Waypoint and Home, alongside artists José Cisneros and Tom Lea.

Public collections

 El Paso Museum of Art
 Museum of Texas Tech University
 National Portrait Gallery
 New Mexico Museum of Art

References

 Additional sources 
 Braddy, Haldeen, The Paradox of Pancho Villa, Illustrated by Manuel Acosta, El Paso, Texas Western Press, 1978.
 Grauer, Paula L. & Michael R. Grauer, Dictionary of Texas Artists, 1800-1945, College Station, Texas, Texas A & M University, 1999.
 Thompson, William R., El Paso Museum of Art'', in American Art Review

1921 births
1989 deaths
American male painters
American portrait painters
Mexican illustrators
Mexican portrait painters
American artists of Mexican descent
United States Army Air Forces personnel of World War II
Chouinard Art Institute alumni
Mexican emigrants to the United States
Murdered Mexican Americans
Deaths by beating in the United States
People murdered in Texas
Male murder victims
University of Texas at El Paso alumni
20th-century American painters
20th-century Mexican painters
20th-century American male artists
Mexican male painters
United States Air Force airmen
Artists from El Paso, Texas
20th-century Mexican male artists